The Mitraliera md. 66 (Mitralieră de companie, calibrul 7,62 mm, model 1966) is a gas-operated rotating bolt-locking medium machine gun, it is a licensed produced copy of the Soviet PKM, used by Romanian Land Forces.  It can be carried and operated by one person, but an assistant gunner is usually employed. It is available with either a 250-round belt or a 100-round box magazine.

There is also a light machine gun variant chambered for the less powerful 7.62×39mm cartridge, RPK like.

Gallery

References
https://web.archive.org/web/20130408102918/http://www.arms.home.ro/

Medium machine guns
Machine guns of Romania
7.62×54mmR machine guns
Infantry weapons of the Cold War